Luca Crecco (born 6 September 1995) is an Italian footballer who plays as a left winger for  club Taranto.

Club career
Crecco scored his first professional career goal with Lazio on 23 April 2017, in a 6–2 home win over Palermo.

On 7 August 2018, Crecco signed with Serie B club Pescara. On 29 January 2021, he was loaned to Cosenza. On 15 July 2021, he joined Vicenza on loan with an option to buy.

On 24 January 2023, Crecco signed a three-year contract with Taranto.

Career statistics

Club

References

External links
 

1995 births
Living people
Footballers from Rome
Italian footballers
Association football midfielders
Serie A players
Serie B players
Serie C players
S.S. Lazio players
Ternana Calcio players
S.S. Virtus Lanciano 1924 players
Modena F.C. players
Trapani Calcio players
U.S. Avellino 1912 players
Delfino Pescara 1936 players
Cosenza Calcio players
L.R. Vicenza players
Taranto F.C. 1927 players